Sarah Gertrude Knott (1895 Kevil, Kentucky – ) was an American folklorist, and folk festival organizer.

Early life 
Sarah Gertrude Knott was born in 1895 in Kevil, Kentucky. She created the National Folk Festival Association in 1933 and founded the National Folk Festival, first held in St Louis, in 1934.

Works 
 "The National Folk Festival after Twelve Years", California Folklore Quarterly, Vol. 5, No. 1 (Jan., 1946), pp. 83-93

Further reading 
 Michael Ann Williams. Staging tradition: John Lair and Sarah Gertrude Knott. Urbana: University of Illinois Press, 2006.

References

External links
 Interview with Sarah Gertrude Knott, 1895-1984, FA Oral Histories. Paper 428.
Knott, Sarah Gertrude, 1895-1984, Western Kentucky University

Created via preloaddraft
1895 births
1984 deaths